Banbury was a rural district in Oxfordshire, England from 1894 to 1974. It was formed under the Local Government Act 1894 from the bulk of the Banbury rural sanitary district, which had been divided among three counties.  The Warwickshire part of the rural sanitary district (except for the Warwickshire part of the parish of Mollington, which joined Oxfordshire) formed the Farnborough Rural District, whilst the area in Northamptonshire formed the Middleton Cheney Rural District.

It covered the rural area north, west and south of Banbury.  The district expanded in 1932 by taking in part of the disbanded Woodstock Rural District.

In 1974 it was abolished, under the Local Government Act 1972, and now forms part of the Cherwell district of Oxfordshire.

See also
History of Banbury

References

External links
Banbury  Rural District boundary map – Vision of Britain website

Rural District
History of Oxfordshire
Districts of England created by the Local Government Act 1894
Districts of England abolished by the Local Government Act 1972
Rural districts of England